Conorbela is a genus of sea snails, marine gastropod mollusks in the family Pseudomelatomidae,..

Species
Species within the genus Conorbela include:
 Conorbela antarctica (Strebel, 1908)

References

 Strebel, H. 1908. Die Gastropoden (mit Ausnahme de nackten Opisthobranchier). Wissenschaftliche Ergebnisse der Schwedischen Südpolar-Expedition 1901-1903 6(1): 111 pp., 6 pls

External links
 
 Bouchet, P.; Kantor, Y. I.; Sysoev, A.; Puillandre, N. (2011). A new operational classification of the Conoidea (Gastropoda). Journal of Molluscan Studies. 77(3): 273-308

 
Pseudomelatomidae
Monotypic gastropod genera